The 1883 Invercargill mayoral election was held on 29 November 1883.

William Sherriffs Moir was elected mayor. His opponents would go on to be the next two mayors.

Results
The following table gives the election results:

References

1883 elections in New Zealand
Mayoral elections in Invercargill